Finkel or Finckel is a surname. Notable people with the name include:

 Alan Finkel, Australia's Chief Scientist
 Aryeh Finkel, rosh yeshiva of the Brachfeld branch of the Mir yeshiva
 Benjamin Finkel, American mathematician and educator
 Binyomin Beinush Finkel, rosh yeshiva of the Mir yeshiva in Jerusalem from 1965–1990
 Caroline Finkel, British historian
 Edwin Finckel, jazz composer
 Eliezer Yehuda Finkel, rosh yeshiva of the Mir yeshiva in Poland and in Jerusalem from 1917–1965
 Eliezer Yehuda Finkel, current rosh yeshiva of the Mir yeshiva in Jerusalem
 Eliyahu Boruch Finkel, a lecturer at the Mir yeshiva in Jerusalem
 Frank Finkel, American who claimed to have been the only survivor of the Battle of the Little Bighorn
 Fyvush Finkel, American actor
 George Finkel, TV sports producer and director
 Irving Finkel, British philologist and Assyriologist
 Howard Finkel, professional wrestling announcer
 Jon Finkel, American Magic: The Gathering champion
 Maurice Herman Finkel, Yiddish theatre performer
 Miriam Dorothy (Posner) Finkel, American radiobiologist who made significant contributions to molecular biology.
 Moishe Finkel, Yiddish theatre manager
 Nosson Tzvi Finkel, the Alter of Slabodka
 Nosson Tzvi Finkel, rosh yeshiva of the Mir yeshiva in Jerusalem from 1990–2008
 Raphael Finkel, American computer scientist
 Shelly Finkel, American boxing promoter
 Terri H. Finkel, American pediatric rheumatologist and immunologist

See also 
 Fin. K.L., Korean female pop group
 Ray Finkle

 Related surnames
 Finkelkraut
 Finkelmann
 Finkelstein

Jewish surnames
German-language surnames